James Lord (born 1879) was an English-born American labor unionist.

Born in England, Lord emigrated to the United States in 1890.  He settled in Farmington, Illinois, where he worked at a colliery, and joined the United Mine Workers of America.  In 1912, he was elected as vice-president of the union' District 12, covering Illinois.

In 1914, the presidency of the Mining Department of the American Federation of Labor (AFL) was made full-time and salaried, and Lord was appointed to the post.  During World War I, he additionally served on the Committee on Labor of the Advisory Commission of the Council of National Defense.  In 1918, he was made treasurer of the new Pan-American Federation of Labor.

The Mining Department was dissolved in 1922, and Lord became an organizer for the AFL, based on the West Coast.  By 1923, his mental health was poor, and his wife had him committed.

References

1879 births
Year of death missing
American trade unionists
English emigrants to the United States
United Mine Workers people